Maurice Perrin may refer to:

 Maurice Perrin (bishop) (1904–1994), French bishop in Tunisia, diplomat
 Maurice Perrin (cyclist) (1911–1992), French Olympic cyclist
 Maurice Perrin (physician) (1875–1956), French physician

See also 
 Perrin (disambiguation)